Fritzi Massary (31 March 1882 – 30 January 1969) was an Austrian-American soprano singer and actress.

Early life and career
Fritzi Massary was born Friederike Massaryk in Vienna in the Austro-Hungarian Empire on 31 March 1882. She was one of the leading operetta singers in Berlin and Vienna.

During World War I, she performed for the soldiers of the Imperial German Army in theatres in occupied Belgium.

In 1920, she worked with the composer Oscar Straus, and performed in several of his operas, including Der letzte Walzer

Emigration to England and America
Massary was of Jewish familial extraction, and had converted to the Protestant religion in 1903. In late 1932 she departed Germany due to the rising persecution of the Jewish population by the Nazis, shortly before they seized dictatorial power in a paramilitary revolution and declared the Third Reich. Traveling through Austria and Switzerland she went to London, where she was befriended by Noël Coward and starred in his theatrical musical Operette in 1938.

In February 1939, shortly before the outbreak of World War II engulfed Europe, she moved to Beverly Hills, California, United States.

Later life
Beginning in 1952, she regularly spent summers in Germany.  She had originally been suggested by Cecil Beaton for the role of 'The Queen of Transylvannia' in the 1964 musical film My Fair Lady but she demanded too much pay  and the part went to Bina Rothschild. 

She continued to reside in Beverly Hills until her death in Los Angeles on 30 January 1969.

Personal life
Massary was married twice, first to an eye doctor Bernhard Pollack. With Karl-Kuno Rollo Graf von Coudenhove (1887–1940), she had her only child, Elisabeth Maria Karl (called Liesl) (1903–1979). Liesl later married the author Bruno Frank. Though Coudenhove was Liesl's father, Massary was never married to him. Massary's second marriage, in 1917, was to the Austrian actor Max Pallenberg (1877–1934), who died in a plane crash in Karlsbad in 1934.

Selected filmography
 The Tunnel (1915)
 The Rose of Stamboul (1919)

References

External links 

 

1882 births
1969 deaths
Musicians from Vienna
Austro-Hungarian Jews
Austrian operatic sopranos
Jewish opera singers
German emigrants to the United States
Converts to Protestantism from Judaism
20th-century Austrian women opera singers